Haunted Hogmanay is a stop motion animated short film created by BBC Scotland and was broadcast on BBC One Scotland on 31 December 2006. The story concerns ghost-hunters working on Hogmanay, the Scots term for New Year's Eve.

Plot
Amateur ghost-hunter Jeff finds his New Year plans hijacked when his acquaintance Thurston makes him go with him to a haunted street called MacLachlan's Close buried underneath Edinburgh's Old Town, to prove that ghosts don't exist. Instead, they end up coming face to face with the ghost of murderer Morag Lachlan MacLachlan who haunts the street every Hogmany.

Voice cast
 Peter Capaldi as Jeff Wylie, an amateur ghost hunter
 Alex Norton as Thurston McCondry, the brother-in-law of Jeff's sister. He takes Jeff with him to MacLachlan's Close to record a show called Debunking the Supernatural and try and prove that ghosts don't exist

Sequel
In 2008 a sequel called Glendogie Bogey was released.

References

BBC Television shows
Scottish television films
BBC Scotland television shows
British animated short films
British television films
2000s British films